Aladdin and His Magic Lamp is a 1970 French animated film directed by Jean Image. It is loosely based on the Arabian Nights tale of Aladdin. Made by Image's fifty-artist crew on a limited schedule in 1969 (from April to November of that year), the film proved successful with children upon its original release.

Paramount Pictures, who picked up the American rights for the film, released it on July 1, 1975, as part of its Saturday "Family Matinee" cinema program. It was Image's second and final film to receive a U.S. release.

Voice cast
Jean-Pierre Leroux as adult Aladdin
Henri Virlojeux as African magician
Claire Guibert as mother of Aladdin
René Hiéronimus as Hou-hou
Lucie Dolène as princess
Fred Pasquali as the genie of the ring, master of darkness and grand vizier
Georges Atlas as the genie of the lamp
Richard Francoeur as the sultan
Michel Gudin as the narrator
Paul Guez as Aladdin as child
Lita Recio as Can-Can

See also
Lists of animated feature films

References

External links

1970 films
Films based on Aladdin
French children's films
Films directed by Jean Image
French animated fantasy films
Paramount Pictures animated films
1970 animated films
1970s French animated films
1970s French-language films
1970s American films